Bolton upon Dearne is a village in the Metropolitan Borough of Barnsley, South Yorkshire, England, in the part of the Dearne Valley through which the River Dearne passes.

History

Bolton upon Dearne was an ancient parish. It was recorded in the Domesday Book as part of the Manor of Bolton-upon-Dearne with Goldthorpe which was owned by Roger de Busli.

In the early 18th century Barnsley attorney William Henry Marsden Esquire of Burntwood Hall bought the Manor of Bolton on Dearne with Goldthorpe with over 1,000 acres (4 km2) of land for £10,000. Bolton upon Dearne and Goldthorpe are recorded in the 1761–1767 Inclosure Awards. The Marsden family continued to hold the manor until 1815.

Bolton upon Dearne became part of Doncaster Rural District under the Local Government Act 1894 until 1899, when it became a separate urban district. Bolton upon Dearne Urban District was abolished in 1937 under a County Review Order, becoming part of the large Dearne Urban District, along with Thurnscoe and part of Barnburgh parish. At the 2011 Census the village in the Dearne South Ward of the Barnsley Metropolitan Council had a population of 6,744.

The village is served by Bolton-on-Dearne railway station.

There are three primary schools in the village: Carrfield School, Heather Garth Primary School and Lacewood. The main secondary school in the area is Astrea Academy Dearne, which caters for around 1,200 pupils aged 11 to 16 years.

The Church of St Andrew the Apostle is on the corner of High Street and Angel Street. It was a 10th-century church with alterations made throughout the centuries. There is a Methodist Church on Furlong Road founded in 1832. There was a Roman Catholic church on Station Road, but this closed in the late 1980s, and became an electrical goods shop.

Sport
Two football teams from the village have competed in the FA Cup: Bolton Athletic F.C. and Bolton United F.C.

Notable people
George Unwin, sergeant pilot during the Battle of Britain, later wing commander

See also
Listed buildings in Dearne South

References

External links
The Inclosure Awards of 1761-67 for Bolton on Dearne with Goldthorpe.

Villages in South Yorkshire
Geography of the Metropolitan Borough of Barnsley